John J. Kinzer (January 28, 1891 – June 11, 1986) was an American farmer and politician.

Kinzer was born on a farm in Cold Spring, Stearns County, Minnesota. He went to the Wakefield Township public schools. He lived on a farm in Cold Spring, Minnesota, with his wife and family. Kinzer served as the Cold Spring Township treasurer and was a Democrat. He served in the Minnesota House of Representatives from 1935 to 1938 and from 1941 to 1962.

References

1891 births
1986 deaths
Farmers from Minnesota
Democratic Party members of the Minnesota House of Representatives